The 13th Thailand National Games (Thai: กีฬาเขตแห่งประเทศไทย ครั้งที่ 13, also known as the 1979 National Games and the 1979 Inter-Provincial Games) were held in Lampang, Thailand from 23 to 29 December 1979, with competition in 14 sports and athletes from 10 regions. These games were the qualification for Thai athletes in the 1978 Asian Games.

Emblem
The emblem of 1979 Thailand National Games was a brown circle, with the emblem of Sports Authority of Thailand on the inside, surrounded by the text

Participating regions
The 13th Thailand National Games represented 10 regions from 72 provinces. Phayao, formerly part of Chiang Rai, made its debut.

Sports

 Athletics
 Badminton
 Basketball
 Boxing
 Cycling
 Football
 Judo
 Lawn tennis
 Sepaktakraw
 Shooting
 Swimming
 Table tennis
 Volleyball
 Weightlifting

References

External links
 Sports Authority of Thailand (SAT)

National Games
Thailand National Games
National Games
Thailand National Games
National Games